The Miss New Jersey Teen USA competition is the pageant that selects the representative for the state of New Jersey in the Miss Teen USA pageant.

New Jersey has had a moderated success at Miss Teen USA, with ten placements. In the first twenty years of the competition, New Jersey only recorded three placements; from 2003 they placed in four of five years. New Jersey's first top five placement came in 2003 when Jacklyn Pezzotta placed fourth runner-up, and this was bettered in 2007 when Alyssa Campanella placed 1st runner up.

Three New Jersey teens (2001, 2006, and 2008) have held the Miss New Jersey USA title and competed at Miss USA. Alyssa Campanella, Miss New Jersey Teen USA 2007, competed twice for Miss New Jersey USA, but relocated to California and won Miss California USA and won the title of Miss USA 2011, the first former Miss New Jersey Teen USA titleholder to win Miss USA, regardless of the representing state.

Isabella Galan of Wayne was crowned Miss New Jersey Teen USA 2022 on April 3, 2022 at Hilton Parsippany Hotel in Parsipanny. She will represent New Jersey for the title of Miss Teen USA 2022.

Results summary

Placements
1st runners-up: Alyssa Campanella (2007)
4th runners-up: Jacklyn Pezzotta (2003), Valentina Sanchez (2014)
Top 10: Rosalie Cuzo (1986), Michelle Knipfelberg (1988), Rachael Carrollo (2004), Julianna White (2006)
Top 12: Kelli Paarz (1994)
Top 15/16: Savannah Schechter (2011), Christina Thompson (2013), JaeLynn Polanco (2020)
New Jersey holds a record of 11 placements at Miss Teen USA.

Awards
Miss Photogenic: Jacklyn Pezzotta (2003), Briahna Reinstein (2017), Ava Tortorici (2019)
Miss Congeniality: Savannah Schechter (2011)

Winners 

Color key

1 Age at the time of the Miss Teen USA pageant

References

External links
Official website

New Jersey
New Jersey culture
Women in New Jersey